Mihkel Jürna (17 September 1899 – 5 December 1972, Tallinn) was an Estonian writer and translator.

He was born in Soonuka in present-day Vinni Parish. He attended schools in Kiltsi and Väike-Maarja. From 1917 until 1923 he studied at the Hugo Treffner Gymnasium in Tartu. After graduation, he entered the Faculty of Law of the University of Tartu and graduated in 1926. From 1934 until 1937 he studied at the university's Faculty of Medicine.

He died in 1972 and is buried at Metsakalmistu Cemetery in Tallinn.

Selected works
 1921: play Idee
 1925: collections Sang and Bumerang (co-authored with Juhan Schütz (Sütiste) and Erni Hiir)
 1927: collection of novellas Tavalised
 1929: collection of novellas Üks armastus
 1932: collection of novellas Ärigeenius
 1972: collection Tavalised

References

1899 births
1972 deaths
20th-century Estonian writers
Estonian male poets
20th-century Estonian poets
Estonian male short story writers
Estonian translators
Hugo Treffner Gymnasium alumni
University of Tartu alumni
Estonian military personnel of the Estonian War of Independence
People from Vinni Parish
Burials at Metsakalmistu